Kevin Schubert (1927-2007) was an Australian professional rugby league footballer who played in the 1940s and 1950s. An international and interstate representative , he played his club football in the Illawarra Rugby League before moving to Sydney's NSWRL Premiership to play for Manly-Warringah, which he also captained.

Playing career
Of German descent, Schubert made his first-grade debut for Wollongong in 1947. While playing there he represented Southern Districts, Country NSW, New South Wales and also gained selection for the 1948 Kangaroo tour. He is listed on the Australian Players Register as Kangaroo No. 246. Schubert also represented New South Wales in life-saving.

After strong competition from other clubs, his friendship formed with Manly-Warringah front rower Roy Bull while the pair were playing for Australia against New Zealand in 1949 saw the Sea Eagles secure the 22-year-old Test hooker's services from the 1950 season. He was selected to represent Sydney against France during their 1951 tour of Australasia in a match that ended in a 19-all draw. He captained Manly-Warringah in their maiden grand final appearance at the end of the 1951 NSWRFL season under coach Wally O'Connell. He retired in 1954 but made a comeback for one more season in 1956.

Death
In early January 2007 Schubert was hospitalized after a fall which broke his hip. On 22 January 2007 Schubert died at Mona Vale Hospital from pneumonia which he contracted whilst in for his hip.

Accolades
Schubert was named in the Illawarra Team of the Century. Later that year he was selected by a panel of experts at hooker in an Australian 'Team of the 50s'.

References

1927 births
Australian rugby league players
Australian people of German descent
New South Wales rugby league team players
Australia national rugby league team players
Manly Warringah Sea Eagles players
Manly Warringah Sea Eagles captains
City New South Wales rugby league team players
2007 deaths
Rugby league hookers